Fletcher Wambo Wamilee (born 6 January 1972) is a Vanuatuan sprinter.

Wamilee competed at the 1992 Summer Olympics held in Barcelona, he entered the 100 metres and ran a time of 11.41 seconds and finished 8th in his heat so didn't qualify for the next round.

References

External links
 

1972 births
Living people
Vanuatuan male sprinters
Athletes (track and field) at the 1992 Summer Olympics
Olympic athletes of Vanuatu